The Marion Football Club is an Australian rules football club first formed in 1891 as the Sturt Football Club (no relation to the SANFL’s Sturt Football Club).  In 1912, Sturt joined the Sturt Football Association, playing against the Blackwood, Mitcham, Brighton, Sturt Ramblers and Glenelg Imperials clubs.

In 1920, Sturt joined the Mid-Southern Football Association along with Blackwood and Brighton, winning the Premiership that season. The Mid-Southern Football Association became the Glenelg District Football Association in 1931, with Sturt once again winning the first premiership.

During the Second World War, Sturt combined with the Brighton and Seacliff club from 1942 to 1945, winning two premierships as a combined entity.

In 1956, Sturt renamed itself the Marion Football Club to avoid confusion with the SANFL team of the same name. Marion continued in the competition known as the Glenelg District Football Association, Glenelg-South-West District Football Association, Glenelg-South Adelaide Football Association and finally the Southern Metropolitan Football League until it folded at the end of the 1986 season.

In 1987, Marion joined the Southern Football League Division 1 competition. In 2018 Marion joined the SAAFL in Division 7.

Marion's Guernsey is predominantly green with a gold sash, like Richmond's Guernsey in the AFL. In 2018 the Rams will wear a new Guernsey design.

Marion FC has produced one Australian Football League (AFL) player, Scott Welsh, formerly of the North Melbourne, Adelaide, and Western Bulldogs clubs.

A-Grade Premierships
1920 Mid-Southern Football Association
1921 Mid-Southern Football Association
1926 Mid-Southern Football Association
1931 Glenelg District Football Association
1944 Glenelg District Football Association (as Sturt-Brighton)
1945 Glenelg District Football Association (as Sturt-Brighton) 
1951 Glenelg-South-West District Football Association A1
1957 Glenelg-South-West District Football Association A2
1958 Glenelg-South-West District Football Association A1
1967 Glenelg-South-West District Football Association A2
2000 Southern Football League Division 1
2018 Adelaide Football League (SAAFL) Division 7

References

External links
 

 
 

Southern Football League (SA) Clubs
Australian rules football clubs in South Australia
1891 establishments in Australia
Australian rules football clubs established in 1891